Sancaktepe Stadium is a football stadium in Sancaktepe, a district in Istanbul, Turkey.

Overview
The stadium is situated at Stad Street of Abdurrahmangazi neighborhood in the Sancaktepe district on the Asian side of Istanbul. Built in 2009 and opened in 2010, it is owned by the Sancaktepe municipality, and operated by the Sancaktepe Beledye Sports Club. The stadium has a seating capacity for 1,920 spectators in two grandstands on both sides of the stadium. It is equipped with floodlights for illumination, and its ground is covered by artificial turf. A parking lot for 100 cars is available.

The stadium is home to football club Sancaktepe FK, who currently play in the TFF Second League.

Name changes
The stadium was initially named after the successful football striker  Hakan Şükür (born 1971), who entered the parliament in 2011 after his retirement from sport. Known for his links to the Islamic Gülen movement, he resigned from politics after a controversy with the party leader Recep Tayyip Erdoğan. His name was then removed from the stadium. In 2014, it was renamed to "Sancaktepe City Stadium".

In later time, it was renamed to "Sancaktepe 15 Temmuz Şehitler Stadı" (literally: Sancaktepe 15 July Martyrs Satdium) in honor of the fallen people during the 2016 coup attempt on 15 July.

International events hosted

On 4 October 2019, the stadium hosted the UEFA Women's Euro 2021 qualifying Group A match of Turkey against Estonia.

References

Sports venues in Istanbul
Football venues in Turkey
Sports venues completed in 2010
2010 establishments in Turkey
Sport in Sancaktepe